Bengt Carl Gustaf Westerberg (born 23 August 1943) is a Swedish politician. He was leader of the Liberal People's Party from 1983 to 1995, member of the Riksdag from 1984 to 1994 and Minister for Social Affairs and Deputy Prime Minister 1991 to 1994.

He is the son of Carl-Erik Westerberg and his wife Barbro (maiden name Wahlström). He graduated from high school in 1962, finished an associate degree in medicine at Karolinska Institute in 1964 and an undergraduate degree in economics and philosophy at Stockholm University in 1974.

He holds office as the Deputy President of the International Federation of Red Cross and Red Crescent Societies in Geneva, Switzerland and is chairman of the Swedish Red Cross.

Westerberg is an atheist and humanist.

He is twice divorced, with two daughters, Hanna Nordh (maiden name Westerberg) and Malin Westerberg from the first marriage and a son, Jacob Westerberg, from his second marriage with Marie Ehrling.

Bibliography
 Minus 100 miljarder : vägar att spara på statens utgifter (1983)
 Välfärdsstatens vägval och villkor (1993)
 Den liberala välfärdsstaten  (1994)
 Han, hon, den, det : om genus och kön (1998)
 Har vi råd med äldrevård när 40-talisterna blir gamla? (2000)
 Var det verkligen bättre förr? : en självbiografisk resa (2012)

References

External links

1943 births
Living people
People from Södertälje
Swedish atheists
Leaders of political parties in Sweden
Deputy Prime Ministers of Sweden
Swedish Ministers for Social Affairs
Swedish feminists
Swedish humanists
Male feminists
Atheist feminists
Members of the Riksdag 1982–1985
20th-century atheists
21st-century atheists
Members of the Riksdag 1985–1988
Members of the Riksdag 1988–1991
Members of the Riksdag 1991–1994
Karolinska Institute alumni
Stockholm University alumni
Members of the Riksdag from the Liberals (Sweden)
20th-century Swedish politicians
Swedish Ministers for Gender Equality